Janbahan (also Romanized as Jānbahān; also known as Jābnahān) is a village in Mehranrud-e Markazi Rural District, in the Central District of Bostanabad County, East Azerbaijan Province, Iran. At the 2006 census, its population was 692, in 128 families.

References 

Populated places in Bostanabad County